Ace (from Ajax.org Cloud9 Editor) is a standalone code editor written in JavaScript. The goal is to create a web-based code editor that matches and extends the features, usability, and performance of existing native editors such as TextMate, Vim, or Eclipse. It can be easily embedded in any web page and JavaScript application. Ace is developed as the primary editor for Cloud9 IDE and as the successor of the Mozilla Skywriter project.

History 

Known as Ace (Ajax.org Cloud9 Editor), it was previously known as Bespin then later Skywriter. Bespin and Ace started as two independent projects both aiming to build a no-compromise code editor component for the web. Bespin started as part of Mozilla Labs and was based on the <canvas> html tag, while Ace is the Editor component of the Cloud9 IDE and is using the DOM for rendering. After the release of Ace at JSConf.eu 2010, in Berlin, the Skywriter team decided to merge Ace with a simplified version of Skywriter's plugin system and some of Skywriter's extensibility points. All these changes were merged back to Ace, which supersedes Skywriter. Both Ajax.org and Mozilla are actively developing and maintaining Ace.

Features 

 Syntax highlighting
 Auto indentation and outdent
 An optional command line
 Work with large documents (handles hundreds of thousands of lines without issue)
 Fully customizable key bindings including vi and Emacs modes
 Themes (TextMate themes can be imported)
 Search and replace with regular expressions
 Highlight matching parentheses
 Toggle between soft tabs and real tabs
 Displays hidden characters
 Highlight selected word
 Multiple cursor selection
 Column select and edit mode

Notable projects using Ace 

 Caret 
 Cloud9 IDE
 CMS Made Simple
 Code Pad IDE
 GitHub
 Halon
 Joplin
Jekyll Admin
 KiwiIRC
 LaTeX Base
 Leanote
 MediaWiki
 OwnCloud
 PythonAnywhere
 RStudio
 Radiant CMS
 Tumblr (theme editor)
 WaveMaker
 Wikia (CSS editor)
 Lines IDE

See also 
 Comparison of JavaScript-based source code editors

Notes

References

External links 
 

Ajax (programming)
JavaScript libraries
JavaScript-based HTML editors
Software using the BSD license